Oğuzhan Asiltürk (25 May 1935 – 1 October 2021) was a Turkish politician. He served as Minister of Industry and Technology and Minister of the Interior as well as Chairman of the Executive Board of the Felicity Party.

Biography
Asiltürk attended secondary school in Malatya. He studied at the School of Civil Engineering at Istanbul Technical University and began his career as a freelance consultant and engineer. He married Sevinç Asiltürk, with whom he had four children.

Asiltürk was elected to the Grand National Assembly of Turkey in 1973, representing Ankara. While serving as a deputy, he was also appointed Minister of the Interior, where he served in 1974 and again from 1975 to 1977. He was then appointed Minister of Industry and Technology and held the position from 1977 to 1978. He was banned from politics for 10 years in 1980. The ban was lifted following the 1987 Turkish constitutional referendum and he became Secretary General of the Welfare Party. In 1991, he was once again elected to the Grand National Assembly, representing Malatya and he joined the Virtue Party. He remained in office until 2002.

Following the death of Necmettin Erbakan, Asiltürk joined the Felicity Party and became Chairman of its Executive Board. He met with President Recep Tayyip Erdoğan on 7 January 2021, a meeting in which Asiltürk alleged that the President told him the Istanbul Convention would be lifted in the country. The President's decision was made official on 20 March 2021, and Turkey withdrew from the Istanbul Convention.

On 13 September 2021, Asiltürk was taken to Ankara Bilkent City Hospital due to shortness of breath from COVID-19. He died of a heart attack on 1 October 2021, at the age of 86. He was interred at Cebeci Asri Cemetery.

References

1935 births
2021 deaths
Turkish politicians
Government ministers of Turkey
Members of the Grand National Assembly of Turkey
National Salvation Party politicians
Welfare Party politicians
Virtue Party politicians
Felicity Party politicians
Istanbul Technical University alumni
People from Hekimhan
Deaths from the COVID-19 pandemic in Turkey
20th-century Turkish politicians
21st-century Turkish politicians
Turkish civil engineers
20th-century Turkish engineers
21st-century Turkish engineers
Burials at Cebeci Asri Cemetery